Histone RNA hairpin-binding protein or stem-loop binding protein (SLBP) is a protein that in humans is encoded by the SLBP gene.

Species distribution 

SLBP has been cloned from humans,  C. elegans, D. melanogaster, X. laevis, and sea urchins.  The full length human protein has 270 amino acids (31 kDa) with a centrally located RNA binding domain (RBD).  The 75 amino acid RBD is well conserved across species, however the remainder of SLBP is highly divergent in most organisms and not homologous to any other protein in the eukaryotic genomes.

Function 
This gene encodes a protein that binds to the histone 3' UTR stem-loop structure in replication-dependent histone mRNAs. Histone mRNAs do not contain introns or polyadenylation signals, and are processed by a single endonucleolytic cleavage event downstream of the stem-loop. The stem-loop structure is essential for efficient processing of the histone pre-mRNA but this structure also controls the transport, translation and stability of histone mRNAs. SLBP expression is regulated during S-phase of the cell cycle, increasing more than 10-fold during the latter part of G1.

All SLBP proteins are capable of forming a highly stable complex with histone stem-loop RNA. Complex formation with the histone mRNA stem-loop is achieved by a novel three-helix bundle fold.  SLBP proteins also recognize the tetraloop structure of the histone hairpin, the base of the stem, and the 5' flanking region. The crystal structure of human SLBP in complex with the stem-loop RNA as well as the exonuclease Eri1 reveals that the Arg181 residue of SLBP specifically interacts with the second guanine base in the RNA stem. The rest of the protein is intrinsically disordered in fruit-flies as well as in humans.  A unique feature of the SLBP RBD is that it is phosphorylated in its RNA binding domain at the Thr171 residue. The SLBP RBD also undergoes proline isomerization about this sequence and is a substrate for the prolyl isomerase Pin1.  The N-terminal domain of human SLBP is required for translation activation of histone mRNAs via its interaction with SLIP1.  SLBP also interacts with the CBP80 associated protein CTIF to facilitate rapid degradation of histone mRNAs.  SLBP is a phosphoprotein and besides T171, it is also phosphorylated at Ser7, Ser20, Ser23, Thr60, Thr61 in mammalian cells.  The phosphorylation at Thr60 is mediated by CK2 and Thr61 is by Cyclin A/Cdk1.

References

Further reading